Princeton is a town in Johnston County, North Carolina, United States. As of the 2010 census it had a population of 1,194. Each May the town celebrates Princeton Community Day, a festival dedicated to promoting community involvement and town pride. The town holds municipal elections in November in odd-number years to elect its mayor and town council.

History
Princeton was incorporated as the town of Boon Hill in 1861, named in homage to the nearby Boon family plantation. It was renamed Princeton in 1873. In 1914 the Gurley Mill was constructed as a corn and feed mill. By 2020 it was the oldest structure in Princeton, until it burned down in November. The Princeton Graded School is listed on the National Register of Historic Places.

Geography
Princeton is in eastern Johnston County at  (35.465236, -78.160414). It rests at 152 feet above sea-level. U.S. Route 70 runs along the northern edge of the town, leading northwest  to Interstate 95 near Selma and southeast  to Goldsboro.

Demographics

2020 census

As of the 2020 United States census, there were 1,315 people, 497 households, and 246 families residing in the town.

2010 census
As of the census of 2010, there were 1,194 people, 502 households, and 320 families residing in the town. The population density was 1,705.7 people per square mile (663.3/km). There were 571 housing units at an average density of 815.7 per square mile (317.2/km). The racial makeup of the town was 67.2% White, 25.5% African American, 5.6% from other races, and 1.7% from two or more races. Hispanic or Latino of any race were 5.9% of the population.

There were 502 households, out of which 28.0% had children under the age of 18 living with them, 41.6% were married couples living together, 18.5% had a female householder with no husband present, and 36.3% were non-families. 31.7% of all households were made up of individuals, and 15.3% had someone living alone who was 65 years of age or older. The average household size was 2.38 and the average family size was 3.00.

In the town, the population was spread out, with 26.0% under the age of 18, 8.5% from 18 to 24, 24.7% from 25 to 44, 23.6% from 45 to 64, and 17.3% who were 65 years of age or older. The median age was 38.4 years. For every 100 females, there were 76.6 males. For every 100 females age 18 and over, there were 74.4 males age 18 and over.

The median income for a household in the town was $32,143, and the median income for a family was $38,063. Males had a median income of $26,726 versus $20,690 for females. The per capita income for the town was $17,116. About 26.5% of families and 30.1% of the population were below the poverty line, including 56.3% of those under age 18 and 12.5% of those age 65 or over.

Education
 Princeton School - one of the last in the state of NC to be a "consolidated school". Now K-5th grades attend a new school built in 2008, while 6th through 12th grades remain at the original location.

References

Works cited

External links
 

Towns in Johnston County, North Carolina
Towns in North Carolina